"Like a Bullet" is a song by Swiss recording artist Stefanie Heinzmann. It was written by Niara Scarlett, Jens Bergmark, Henrik Korpi, and Mattias Franzen and produced by Marek Pompetzki and Paul NZA for her debut album Masterplan (2008). Released as the album's second single, it reached the top twenty of the German and Swiss Single Chart.

Charts

Weekly charts

References

External links
  
 

2008 singles
2008 songs
Stefanie Heinzmann songs
Songs written by Niara Scarlett
Universal Music Group singles
Songs written by Henrik Korpi